Erling Petersen (13 July 1906 – 29 August 1992) was a Norwegian economist and politician for the Conservative Party.

He was born in Oslo.

He was elected to the Norwegian Parliament from Oslo in 1954, and was re-elected on four occasions. He had previously served in the position of deputy representative during the term 1950–1953.

References

1906 births
1992 deaths
Conservative Party (Norway) politicians
Members of the Storting
20th-century  Norwegian economists
20th-century Norwegian politicians